B.S. Abdur Rahman Crescent Institute of Science and Technology, formerly B. S. Abdur Rahman University, is a private university located in Tamil Nadu, India. Previously, functioning under University of Madras (1984–2001) and Anna University (2001–09) as Crescent Engineering College, the institute gained deemed status in 2008–09. It is located in Vandalur near Tambaram and opposite to Arignar Anna Zoological Park, a suburban area of Chennai, India.

History

B. S. Abdur Rahman Crescent Institute of Science and Technology was founded by Tamil businessman and philanthropist B. S. Abdur Rahman in 1984 as Crescent Engineering College, a Muslim minority institution approved by the All India Council of Technical Education and affiliated to University of Madras. The college was affiliated to University of Madras until the year 2001. From 2002, many engineering colleges in the city of Chennai changed affiliations to Anna University. University of Madras became an umbrella university, exclusively for non-professional, Art & Sciences colleges that offer BSc & BCom degrees. Many colleges chose not to affiliate with any university and became deemed universities in their own right. Crescent Engineering College was affiliated to Anna University until 2008. It was elevated to deemed to be university status as B. S. Abdur Rahman University in December 2008. In 2017, it was renamed as B.S. Abdur Rahman Crescent Institute of Science and Technology following the UGC request to drop the "University" from the name.

Location
The institute is located in the Seethakathi Estate, Vandalur, Chennai, on the GST Road (Chennai-Trichy National Highway NH 45), seven km from Tambaram Railway Station, 30 km from Chennai Moffusil Bus Terminus (Koyambedu) and 17 km from the Chennai International Airport.  It is situated right next to Anna Zoological Park (Vandalur Zoo) and is spread over 64 acres of greenery along the GST road.

Academic departments 
B.S. Abdur Rahman Crescent Institute of Science and Technology is structured around ten schools of study. Research centres are also part of the schools, encouraging interdepartmental collaboration and opportunity for students to participate in exciting research projects. The academic activities of the school are monitored by the respective Deans.

School of Infrastructure Sciences
 Department of Civil Engineering

School of Mechanical Sciences
 Department of Aerospace Engineering
 Department of Automobile Engineering
 Department of Mechanical Engineering
 Department of Polymer Engineering TECH

School of Electrical and Communication Sciences
 Department of Electronics and Communication Engineering
 Department of Electrical and Electronics Engineering
 Department of Electronics and Instrumentation Engineering

School of Computer, Information and Mathematical Sciences
 Department of Computer Science and Engineering
 Department of Computer Applications
 Department of Information Technology
 Department of Actuarial Science

School of Physical and Chemical Sciences
 Department of Chemistry
 Department of Physics

Crescent School of Business(CSB)
 Master of Business Administration with Strategy Focus

Crescent Business School(CBS)
 Master of Business Administration

Crescent School of Architecture(CSA)
 B.Arch.
 B.Des.
 M.Arch.

School of Islamic Studies
 B.A. Islamic Studies
 M.A. Islamic Studies

School of Social Sciences & Humanities
 Department of English
 Department of Economics
 Department of Sociology
 Department of Public Policy

School of Life Sciences
 Department of Biotechnology
 Department of Cancer biology
 Department of Genetics & Genomics
 Department of Micro Biology
 Department of Molecular Biology & Bio Chemistry

Crescent School of Law (CSOL)
B.B.A., L.L.B.
B.A., L.L.B.
B.Com., L.L.B.

School of Pharmacy
B.Pharm.

Achievements 
Institution's Innovation Council (IIC) of B.S. Abdur Rahman Crescent Institute of Science & Technology powered by Crescent Innovation & Incubation Council (CIIC) is crowned with a prestigious 5 STAR rating for the year 2019 – 2020. Additionally, B.S. Abdur Rahman Crescent Institute of Science & Technology ranked in top 25 by ARIIA, Ministry of Education in Innovation & Startups.

Rankings

B.S. Abdur Rahman Crescent Institute of Science and Technology was ranked 102 among engineering colleges in India by the National Institutional Ranking Framework (NIRF) in 2022 and in the 151–200 band among all universities.

Notable alumni 
 Arya, actor
 Karthi, Actor
 Priya Bhavani Shankar (PBS), Actress
 Suriya moorthy (Suriya), CEO

References

External links
 

Deemed universities in Tamil Nadu
Islamic universities and colleges in India
Engineering colleges in Chennai
Universities in Chennai
Academic institutions formerly affiliated with the University of Madras